G. Thilakavathi (or Thilagavathi) is a police officer and Tamil writer from Tamil Nadu, India.

Biography
Thilakavathi was born in and completed her schooling in the Dharmapuri district of Tamil Nadu. She is an alumnus of Auxilium College, Vellore and Stella Maris College, Chennai. In 1976, she became the first woman from Tamil Nadu to become an Indian Police Service (IPS) officer. She began her police career as an Assistant superintendent of Police serving in Vellore and later Tiruchirappalli. She subsequently served as Deputy Commissioner of Police of Chennai and Superintendent of Police in the Civil Supplies CID and Commercial Crime Investigation Wing, before being promoted to the rank of Deputy inspector general of police (DIG), while being posted to the Railways in early 1993. Later that year, she was appointed the DIG for the Chengalpattu-MGR range, that covered districts Chengalpattu East and West, and South Arcot. In the process became the first woman DIG of the State. In 2007, she was promoted to Additional Director General of Police (ADGP). In 2010, she was posted as chairman of the Tamil Nadu Uniformed Services Recruitment Board, upon receiving a promotion to the rank of Director general of police.

As writer 
In 1987, her first short story was published in Dinakaran. Her first short story collection to be published in book form was 'Theyumo sooriyan'. She is a prolific writer who has written more than 300 short stories and a number of novels and poems. Her short stories Theiyumo Sooriyan (Will the Sun Wane) and Arasigal aluvathillai (Queens don’t cry) won the Government of Tamil Nadu's best short story prize for 1988-89. Her novel Pathini Penn (1983) was made into a film. Some of her works including Vaarthai thavari vittai, Arasigal aluvathillai and Muppathu kodi mugangal have been adapted for television. She is also a translator for Sahitya Akademi and has translated Nizhal Kodugal, Uthirum Ilaigalin Oosai, Govarthan Ram and 50 short stories into Tamil. In 2005, she was awarded the Sahitya Akademi Award for Tamil for her novel Kalmaram (lit. The Stone Tree).

Partial bibliography

Novels
Kalmaram
Vaarthai thavari vittai
Muppathu kodi mugangal
Nalai enathu rajangam
Pathini penn
Kanavai soodiya natchathiram
Oru aathmavin diary - sila varangal
Unakagaava naan

Short story collections
Arasigal aluvathillai
Theyumo sooriyan

Poetry collections
Alai puralum karayoram

References

External links

Indian Police Service officers
Living people
Women writers from Tamil Nadu
Recipients of the Sahitya Akademi Award in Tamil
Tamil writers
Indian women police officers
Tamil civil servants
20th-century Indian women writers
20th-century Indian novelists
20th-century Indian poets
20th-century Indian short story writers
Indian women novelists
Indian women poets
Indian women short story writers
People from Dharmapuri district
Stella Maris College, Chennai alumni
Novelists from Tamil Nadu
Year of birth missing (living people)